Israeli Andalusian Orchestra is an Israeli orchestra  founded in Ashdod, Israel.

History
A project to honor the heritage of immigrants from the Magreb which was to become the Israeli Andalusian Orchestra, was formed in Ashdod in December 1987, as a joint initiative of the liturgical singer and classical conductor Moti Malka and then-mayor Arieh Azulay, both of Moroccan origin.
The Israeli Andalusian Orchestra, which is financed by the Ashdod municipality and the Culture Ministry, has become an Israeli musical and cultural icon, touring in Israel, the United States, and European countries.

The orchestra is composed of around 30 musicians and lyricists mainly of Tunisian, Moroccan and Russian origin and features traditional Sephardic Jewish-Arab and Andalusian music and poetry, combining classical Arab-Andalusian and European instruments. The orchestra's artistic director and head conductor is Sivan Albo-Ben Hur.

Awards and recognition
In 2006, the orchestra was awarded the Israel Prize, for its lifetime achievement and special contribution to society and the State.

See also
Music of Israel
List of Israel Prize recipients

References

External links
Orchestre Andalou d'Israel - CDs. Magda Records
Orchestre Andalou d'Israel - Videos
The Life and Death Andalusian Orchestra. Documentary film. Directed by David Noy 

Israeli orchestras
Israel Prize recipients that are organizations
Israel Prize for lifetime achievement & special contribution to society recipients
Ashdod
Musical groups established in 1994
1994 establishments in Israel